The Coronado 25 is an American trailerable sailboat that was designed by Ed Edgar and Frank W. Butler as a cruiser and first built in 1966.

Production
The design was built by Coronado Yachts in the United States from 1966 to 1975. It was also built by Russell Marine in the United Kingdom, but it is now out of production.

Design
The Coronado 25 is a recreational keelboat, built predominantly of fiberglass, with wood trim. It has a masthead sloop rig; a spooned, raked stem; a raised counter, angled transom; an internally mounted spade-type rudder controlled by a tiller and a fixed fin keel of stub keel and centerboard.

The boat is normally fitted with a small  outboard motor for docking and maneuvering.

The design has sleeping accommodation for five people, with a double "V"-berth in the bow cabin, a dinette table that lowers into a double berth in the main cabin and an aft quarter berth on the port side. The galley is located on the port side just forward of the companionway ladder. The galley is equipped with a two-burner stove, an icebox and a sink. The head is located just aft of the bow cabin on the starboard side.

Variants
Coronado 25
This fix fin keel model displaces  and carries  of lead ballast. The boat has a PHRF racing average handicap of 231.
Coronado 25 CB
This centerboard model displaces  and carries  of ballast. The boat has a PHRF racing average handicap of 231.

Operational history
In a 2010 review Steve Henkel wrote that the design was, "in the vanguard of early fiberglass designs".

See also
List of sailing boat types

References

External links
Photo of a Coronado 25 sailing
Coronado 25 video tour

Keelboats
1960s sailboat type designs
Sailing yachts
Trailer sailers
Sailboat type designs by Frank Butler
Sailboat type designs by Ed Edgar
Sailboat types built by Coronado Yachts
Sailboat types built by Russell Marine